

The Unity of the Brethren is the province of the Moravian Church in the Czech Republic. It is successor and part of the religious movement Unity of the Brethren.

See also
History of the Moravian Church

References

Further reading

External links
 

Protestantism in the Czech Republic
Provinces of the Moravian Church